Direct Fly s.r.o. (sometimes called DirectFly s.r.o.) is a Czech aircraft manufacturer currently based in Brno and founded in 2006 in Hluk. The company specializes in the design and manufacture of ultralight aircraft in the form of ready-to-fly aircraft for the Fédération Aéronautique Internationale microlight and the American light-sport aircraft categories. The organization is a Czech společnost s ručením omezeným, or private limited company.

Direct Fly was established in a part of the country noted for its aircraft manufacturing to take advantage of the existing available pool of skilled workers.

In 2008 the company had seven employees. In 2012 Jane's Information Group reported the company then had ten employees, plus seven international dealers.

By 2017 the company was building just one microlight aircraft design, the two-seat, low-wing Alto 912TG, the Direct Fly ArGO having gone out of production. The Alto has been accepted by the US Federal Aviation Administration as a light-sport aircraft.

By March 2019 the company had two more designs under development, the low-wing Orange and high-wing STOL Cruiser.

The company first exhibited in the United States at the Sun 'n Fun in Lakeland, Florida, in April 2010. The company has been noted for its short wait times for aircraft ordered.

By December 2017 the company had exported at least three aircraft to the U.S. since there were three Altos registered with the US Federal Aviation Administration as light-sport aircraft.

Aircraft

References

External links

Aircraft manufacturers of the Czech Republic and Czechoslovakia
Ultralight aircraft
Homebuilt aircraft